Dolcihopodomintho is a genus of flies in the family Tachinidae.

Species
Dolichopodomintho dolichopiformis Townsend, 1927
Dolichopodomintho takanoi Mesnil, 1973

References

Tachinidae
Fauna of China
Invertebrates of Taiwan
Taxa named by Charles Henry Tyler Townsend
Diptera of Asia